Sybra spinipennis is a species of beetle in the family Cerambycidae. It was described by Breuning in 1954.

References

spinipennis
Beetles described in 1954